Louis Ramsay (born 23 September 1997) is an English professional footballer who plays as a right-back for Concord Rangers.

Career
In July 2014, Ramsay joined Norwich City on a scholarship having previously been with Tottenham Hotspur. In July 2017, he joined National League side Woking on a season-long loan deal. In July 2018, he signed a deal with Leicester City, spending the season with their under-23 side.

In 2019, he joined National League South side Billericay Town before spending time on loan at Isthmian League side Hornchurch the following year. He made eight appearances for Hornchurch in all competitions.

In June 2021, Ramsay headed abroad to sign for USL Championship side Rio Grande Valley. On 6 June 2021, he made his professional debut, starting in a 4–2 win over Miami FC.

On 19 February 2022, Ramsay returned to England and signed for National League South side Concord Rangers.

Career statistics

References

External links

Living people
1997 births
Sportspeople from Essex
Association football defenders
English footballers
Black British sportspeople
Norwich City F.C. players
Woking F.C. players
Leicester City F.C. players
Billericay Town F.C. players
Hornchurch F.C. players
Rio Grande Valley FC Toros players
Concord Rangers F.C. players
National League (English football) players
Isthmian League players
USL Championship players
English expatriate footballers
Expatriate soccer players in the United States
English expatriate sportspeople in the United States